The BlackBerry Electron (8703/8700/8707) is a series of discontinued BlackBerry smart phone developed by Research In Motion Ltd and released in 2005. The Electron use a mini-SIM.

Launch
The Blackberry Electron was announced in Q4 of 2004 and formally launched in the fall of 2005. The gross profit reported by RIM's income statement, as of March 2006 (about four months after the release of the Electron), was US$1.37 billion.

Manufacturing
Most of the materials that make up the BlackBerry Electron and other BlackBerry devices, such as flexible circuit boards, were manufactured in China.

Hardware

Body
Dimensions: 110 x 69.5 x 19.5 mm (4.33 x 2.74 x 0.77 in)

Weight: 134 g (4.73 oz)

Keyboard: QWERTY

Display
Technology: LCD Display

Resolution: 320 x 240 pixels

Color Depth: 16-bit (65K colors)

Sound
Alert types: Vibration; Polyphonic, MP3 ringtones

Loudspeaker: Yes

3.5 mm jack: No

Memory
Card slot: No

Internal: 64 MB storage, 16 MB RAM

Battery
Battery type: Lithium-Ion 1100 mAh battery.

Stand-by time: up to 450 hours

Talk time: Up to 4 hours

Camera
There is not a built in Camara

Software

Interface 
The interface of the BlackBerry Electron is graphical and uses menus and icons for navigation.

Music and ringtones
All 8700 series phones come with MP3 ringtone support. Also, saved songs can be played by clicking on the media icon.

Network
The 3 versions of the Electron differed in network support  the original (8700) model supported Quad-band GSM (EDGE/GPRS). The 8707 (AKA "UMTS Electron") added 2100 MHz UMTS 3G and the 8703 model was designed for US CDMA operators and supported both 850 MHz and 1900 MHz CDMA2K (EvDO/1xRTT)  the 8703 also has A-GPS support, which was not present on the GSM/UMTS variants. All variants have Bluetooth, and USB facilities. The quad-band network (on the 8700 and 8707, but not the 8703) gave it an edge over its competitors, such as the Palm Treo, as it was the best network available for international travelers in 20052006.

References

External links

 BlackBerry Smartphones
 BlackBerry 8700 Series

Mobile phones with an integrated hardware keyboard
Electron